The Hampton Double Square Historic District is a historic district located in Hampton, Iowa, United States. It has been listed on the National Register of Historic Places since 2003. At the time of its nomination it contained 43 resources, which included 28 contributing buildings, two contributing sites, 10 non-contributing buildings, one non-contributing site, one non-contributing structures, and on non-contributing object. The town of Hampton was laid out by H.P. Allen, who was the county surveyor, in June 1856. The original plat was eight blocks by eight blocks in the shape of an “L”. Near the center of the “L” was the two-block, or double, square. While many county seats in Iowa have a courthouse square, the double square is a rarity. Four double squares were platted in Iowa, but only those in Hampton and Sidney survived their early period of development. Estherville's square was platted as a four-block square, but its development created a double square instead. Hampton has the only symmetrical double square plan in the state. The double square exemplifies the two primary functions of a public square, both commercial and public development.

The district's period of significance is from 1856, when it was of platted, to 1935 when the last public building was constructed. Building usage is largely commercial with a few public/government buildings, and the Congregational Church. The buildings are largely two stories tall and constructed of brick in the styles that were popular at the time. Many of the commercial blocks are Italianate in design. The Franklin County Sheriff's Residence and Jail (1880), the Franklin County G. A. R. Soldiers' Memorial Hall (1890; Edward Carl Keifer), and the Franklin County Courthouse (1891; T. D. Allen) are individually listed on the National Register of Historic Places.

References

Hampton, Iowa
Italianate architecture in Iowa
Buildings and structures in Franklin County, Iowa
Historic districts in Franklin County, Iowa
Historic districts on the National Register of Historic Places in Iowa
National Register of Historic Places in Franklin County, Iowa